Nagalit ang Buwan sa Haba ng Gabi is a 1983 Filipino drama film written and directed by Danny Zialcita. It depicts and tackles the love affairs, homosexuality, and adultery.

The film revolves the seemingly normal love polygon - Delza (Laurice Guillen), the long-suffering and problematic wife; Stella (Gloria Diaz), the mistress; and Miguel (Dindo Fernando), the adulterous husband. There are a few more cornerstones in this love polygon, like Dimitri (Eddie Garcia), Stella's husband who is gay and Raul (Tommy Abuel), Delza's ex-boyfriend as well as some other characters that would make a huge connection to the story filled with fiascoes of marriage and affairs.

The film was digitally restored and remastered in high-definition by the ABS-CBN Film Restoration Project and Central Digital Lab. The restored version was premiered on November 17, 2016, at Trinoma Cinema 1.

Cast
Laurice Guillen as Delza Almeda
Gloria Diaz as Stella de Joya
Dindo Fernando as Miguel Almeda
Eddie Garcia as Dimitri de Joya
Janice de Belen as Jenny Almeda
Tommy Alvaro as Tony Almeda
Suzanne Gonzales 
 Odette Khan 
Tommy Abuel as Raul

Reception
According to a mixed-positive review by Reverse Delay regarding the film and its restoration, “The newly-restored classic proves that we have been fascinated with romance-dramas about infidelity for so long now.” and “Old films can show us how far we have come; if not as a society, then at least as a film-producing culture. Although, equally often, these historical works reveal precisely how much we have stayed the same.”

Remake

This movie was remade in 2013 under the title When the Love Is Gone and directed by Andoy Ranay for Viva Films. It stars Cristine Reyes playing Gloria Diaz's character, Gabby Concepcion as Dindo Fernando's character, Alice Dixson playing Laurice Guillen's role, Andi Eigenmann in Janice de Belen's previous role, and Jake Cuenca playing the role played by Eddie Garcia.

Gallery

See also
 When the Love is Gone

References

External links
 

Filipino-language films
Philippine drama films
1983 films
Films set in the Philippines
Star Cinema films
Films directed by Danny Zialcita